Betzenberg (Schönbuch) is a mountain in Baden-Württemberg, Germany.

See also 
 List of hills of the Schönbuch

Mountains and hills of Baden-Württemberg
Schönbuch